Rob Holland (born ) is a highly accomplished aerobatic pilot from the United States. currently residing in Nashua, New Hampshire.  Holland is one of the most decorated aerobatic pilots in U.S. history, with an impressive list of accomplishments that includes multiple championship titles and groundbreaking innovations in the field of aerobatics.

Biography
Holland has always been deeply passionate about aviation.  He pursued his interest by enrolling at Daniel Webster College where he earned his Bachelor of Science Degrees in Aviation Flight Operations and Aviation Management.  He also earned his Pilots Ratings from the same institution. Soon after obtaining his pilot's license, he began actively learning aerobatics. 

Throughout his career, Holland gained extensive experience in various aviation roles, such as corporate pilot, commuter pilot, banner tower, flight instructor, and ferry pilot. He even founded his own aerobatic flight school. 

Holland has gained over 14000 flight hours in more than 180 different types of aircraft. 

Since 2002, Holland has been an active participant in airshows.  Robs unique approach to aerobatics, which includes introducing innovative maneuvers that had never been seen before, earned him a reputation as one of the most creative and skilled aerobatic pilots in the world.  

Holland's formation aerobatic skills have been showcased through his performances with both the Firebirds Xtreme team and The 4CE (Force) aerobatic team.

In 2012, Holland was the International Council of Air Shows prestigious Art Scholl Award for Showmanship recipient.

Rob has also been an active member of the Competition Aerobatic community since 2001.  He has represented the USA as a member of the US Advanced Aerobatic team and the US Unlimited Aerobatic Team.

Holland's championship titles include five-time consecutive World 4-minute Freestyle Aerobatic Champion, eleven-time consecutive U.S. National Aerobatic Champion, and twelve-time U.S. 4-minute Freestyle Aerobatic Champion. In addition, he has won the 2015 World Air Games Freestyle Gold Medal, and is the 2008 World Advanced Aerobatic Champion. He has also been the recipient of the Charlie Hillard Trophy four times (in 2013, 2017, 2019, and 2022). and the Eric Müller Trophy in 2019. He has also won 28 medals in international competition, including 12 gold medals.    

Holland is the only pilot in history to win: five consecutive World 4-minute Freestyle titles, Eleven consecutive U.S. National titles, and twelve total U.S. 4-minute Freestyle titles.

Career Highlights

 2019 Eric Müller Trophy Recipient 
5 Time World Freestyle Aerobatic Champion in 2011, 2013, 2015, 2017 and 2019 
 11 Time U.S. National Aerobatic Champion in 2011, 2012, 2013, 2014, 2015, 2016, 2017, 2018, 2019, 2021, 2022 
 12 Time U.S. National Freestyle Aerobatic Champion in 2008, 2011, 2012, 2013, 2014, 2015, 2016, 2017, 2018, 2019, 2021, 2022 
2021 Honorary member of First Flight Society 
2019 named Honorary Blue Angel
2018 Society of Honorary Snowbirds Inductee
 4 Time recipient of the Charlie Hillard Trophy 2013, 2017, 2019, and 2022 
 2016 Sky Grand Prix Aerobatic Freestyle Gold Medalist 
 2015 World Air Games Aerobatic Freestyle Gold Medalist 
 2012 Recipient of the Art Scholl Award for Showmanship 
 2008 World Advanced Aerobatic Champion 
 2006 World Advanced Aerobatic Championships Silver Medalist 
 U.S. Aerobatic Team Captain 2013, 2017, 2019, 2022
 U.S. Unlimited Aerobatic Team Member 2011, 2013, 2015, 2017, 2019, 2022
 U.S. Advanced Aerobatic Team Member 2004, 2006 and 2008

Aircraft
Rob Holland has flown over 180 different type of aircraft.  He has flown multiple types in his airshows and aerobatic competition career.

Pitts S-2C 
In 2002, Rob Holland commenced his airshow career in a Pitts S-2C, which he also utilized for aerobatic instruction at Aerial Advantage Aviation, his flight school in Nashua, New Hampshire. He flew the aircraft in the advanced category at aerobatic competitions, winning several regional contests and qualifying for his first U.S. Aerobatic Team in 2003. Holland continued to fly the Pitts S-2C in competitions and airshows until 2005.

Ultimate 20-300S 
From 2005 to 2007, Holland flew the Ultimate 20-300S, a two-seat experimental aerobatic biplane with a high-powered AEIO-540 engine, in airshows and aerobatic competitions. He flew a borrowed single-seat version of the Ultimate (10-300S) at the World Advanced Aerobatic Championships (AWAC) in 2004 and 2006, earning a Silver medal finish in the 2006 competition.

MX2 
In 2007, Holland acquired an MX2 (serial number 002), which he flew in aerobatic competitions and airshows until 2011. He earned a Gold medal finish in the 2008 World Advanced Aerobatic Championships and his first U.S. National Aerobatic Freestyle title in the same year. Holland also qualified for the 2011 U.S. Unlimited Aerobatic Team while flying the MX2 in the 2010 U.S. National Aerobatic Championships.

MXS-RH 
Currently, Holland's aerobatic aircraft of choice is the all-carbon-fiber MXS-RH, which he began flying in 2011. The MXS-RH is a one-of-a-kind, American designed, single-seat competition and airshow-ready aerobatic airplane, designed and built by MX Aircraft with modifications suggested by Holland himself. The aircraft is powered by a Lycoming AEIO-540 engine generating 380 horsepower and weighing a minimal 1200 pounds, allowing it to perform at an astonishing level, with the capability of pulling 16 positive and negative Gs and rolling at almost 500 degrees per second. Holland has won numerous World Aerobatic Freestyle Championships and ten of his eleven U.S. Nationals Aerobatic Champion titles in the MXS, as well as ten of his twelve U.S. Nationals Aerobatic Freestyle Champion titles. The MXS-RH's outstanding performance has enabled Holland to execute innovative maneuvers unmatched on the airshow circuit. .

Innovative New Aerobatic Maneuvers
Rob Holland has been credited with the invention and introduction of many innovative aerobatic maneuvers

Inside Tumble 
The Inside Tumble is an aerobatic maneuver in which the aircraft rotates around its lateral axis in a positive pitching motion while traveling along a ballistic path and yawed 90 degrees to its flight path.

Frisbee 
While in level horizontal flight, the aircraft is rotated in the yaw axis 360 degrees (like a frisbee) and then continues along the same level horizontal flight path.

Inverted Frisbee 
Similar to the Frisbee except the aircraft yaws 360 degrees in level inverted horizontal flight.

Nivek 
The "Nivek" is a collaborative creation involving American Aerobatic Pilot Kevin Coleman  (https://www.facebook.com/TheKevinColeman/), whose name is spelled backwards in the maneuver's title. The Nivek begins with an aggressive pitch at the top of a vertical line, transitioning the aircraft to a level inverted flight. The aircraft is then pitched negatively 360 degrees in place, returning it to a level inverted attitude. After that, the aircraft performs a one and one-quarter rolling spin, finishing the maneuver inverted on a 45-degree down line.

Forward Endo  
The Forward Endo is a maneuver where the aircraft rapidly pitches nose downward along its lateral axis, rotating over 540 degrees around that same axis, all while giving the impression of being stationary in space. This maneuver is commonly used in figures like the "Cardiac Express" and the "Typhoon Tumble".

Rolling Spin 
During the Rolling Spin, the aircraft is in a fully stalled state.  It is simultaneously in a fully developed spin while also rolling around its longitudinal axis.

See also 

 Competition Aerobatics
 FAI World Aerobatic Championships
 Aerobatic Maneuver
 International Aerobatic Club
 MX Aircraft

References



1974 births
Living people
Aerobatic pilots
People from Nashua, New Hampshire
Aviators from New Hampshire